Major General Jaafar Mohammed Saad (born 1950 – died 6 December 2015) was a Yemeni politician and soldier.

Saad was a soldier for South Yemen before unification with North Yemen in 1990. Local officials said he fought for South Yemen in the Yemeni Civil War of 1994 and later lived in exile in Egypt and the United Kingdom.

Saad, who held the rank of Major-General, helped government forces defend the city of Aden from Houthis in the Yemeni Civil War of 2015. He was appointed as Governor of Aden Governorate on 9 October 2015.

Saad was killed in a car bombing on his convoy in the Tawahi district of Aden on 6 December 2015. Five of his bodyguards died as well. Islamic State militants claimed responsibility for the attack.

See also 
 2015 Aden car bombing

References

2015 deaths
Assassinated Yemeni politicians
Governors of Aden
Yemeni generals
Year of birth missing
Yemeni military personnel killed in the Yemeni Civil War (2014–present)
People from Aden Governorate
1950 births
21st-century Yemeni politicians